Kyle Bailey is a former American politician, who was elected to the Maine House of Representatives in 2020. He briefly represented the 27th district as a member of the Maine Democratic Party. He resigned in October 2021 after less than one year of service.

References

Year of birth missing (living people)
Gay politicians
LGBT state legislators in Maine
Democratic Party members of the Maine House of Representatives
Living people
Politicians from Gorham, Maine
21st-century American politicians